The 2014 Galway Senior Hurling Championship was the 117th staging of the Galway Senior Hurling Championship since its establishment in 1887.

The Preliminary Round and First Round draws  were made on 11 March 2014 at the Salthill Hotel. Gort won the final on 14 December 2014.

Format
22 teams contested the 2014 championship. The competition consisted of 2 full rounds of games (and two preliminary rounds), followed by a group stage and then quarter-finals, semi-finals and a final - as well as qualifier group to help decide which team will be relegated and a Shield Competition.

Matthew Keating Controversy

At a Galway Competitions Control Committee meeting on 2 October 2014 it was ruled that Turloughmore would forfeit their Group C game against Beagh which was played on 14 September 2014 due to the fielding of an ineligible player. Turloughmore's Matthew Keating had been granted an inter-county transfer to Long Island Gaels in New York deeming him ineligible to play in the Galway Senior Hurling Championship as it is not permitted for a player to play in two different championships in a single year.

The group game was forfeited without award of the 2 points to Beagh. Nevertheless, Beagh moved to second in the group and were therefore eligible to play Ardrahan in the quarter finals. All this despite the fact that Turloughmore and Ardrahan had already contested the quarter final on 27 September 2014 - a game which has now also been declared null and void.

Turloughmore appealed the decision to the Connacht Council on 8 October 2014 who upheld the decision. A further appeal was lodged with the Disputes Resolution Authority (DRA).

On 11 October 2014 the Galway County Board released a statement stating that they will establish a new investigation committee to reprocess the request from Beagh to investigate the composition of the Turloughmore team that played in the Galway Senior Hurling Championship Game on 14 September 2014. Consequently, the quarter final between Ardrahan and Beagh scheduled for 12 October 2014 was postponed. The new investigation on 22 October 2014 confirmed the initial ruling - that Turloughmore be eliminated from the championship.

Turloughmore's final appeal against their expulsion from the competition failed on 17 November with an official statement released saying "At a hearing before the Disputes Resolution Authority Tribunal, held in Mullingar on Monday evening, 17 November 2014, the appeal of CLG Turloughmore against the decision of the Galway Competitions Control Committee was unsuccessful.”This allows the Galway Senior Hurling Championship to recommence immediately."

Fixtures and results

Preliminary to Round 1
A single game open draw from the 20 teams excluding the senior and intermediate champions of 2013 - Portumna and Kilnadeema-Leitrim.

Round 1

20 Teams: the winner of the Preliminary to Round 1 game plus 19 other teams - all teams excluding the loser of Preliminary to Round 1 game and the 2013 Intermediate Champions Kilnadeema-Leitrim. The 10 games of this round were to be decided by open draw - the winners progressed to the group phase, the losers to Round 2.

Preliminary to Round 2
Another single game open draw - this time from the losers of the Round 1 games. The teams that took part in the Preliminary to Round 1 game were exempt from this game. The loser of this game progressed to the qualifier/relegation group phase.

Round 2
10 Teams: the losing team from the Preliminary to Round 1 game, losing teams from Round 1 plus the winner of the Preliminary to Round 2 game. The winners of the 5 games progressed to the group phase, the losers to the qualifier/relegation group phase.

Group Phase (Rounds 3, 4 & 5)
16 Teams: the 10 winners from Round 1, the 5 winners from Round 2 and the 2013 Intermediate Champions Kilnadeema-Leitrim.

An open draw made in the Maldron Hotel, broadcast live on Galway Bay FM on 13 May 2014 decided 4 groups containing 4 teams each. The top two teams in each group qualified for the quarter-finals. The third and fourth placed teams played in the Shield Competition.

Group A

Group B

Group C

 Game between Turloughmore and Beagh has been declared null and void.

 The original fixture on 19 July in Athenry was postponed due to torrential rain at half time. The score at the time was Craughwell 0-7 - 0-6 Beagh

Group C Null and Void Game

 Turloughmore forfeited the fixture for playing an ineligible player without award of the game to Beagh. See section "Matthew Keating Controversy"

Group D

Knockout stages

Quarter-finals
An open draw of the 8 first and second placed teams from the Group Phase was made at Kenny Park, Athenry on 14 September 2014.

Quarter Final Null and Void game

 As a result of the Turloughmore v Beagh Group C game being voided, this game was also null and voided. See section Matthew Keating Controversy.

Semi-finals
An open draw of the quarter-final winners was made in Athenry on 28 September 2014

Final

The 2014 County final was played on 14 December 2014 in Kenny Park, Athenry due to the closure of Pearse Stadium. The game was shown deferred on TG4.

Qualifier Group Phase
Six teams, the losers of the Preliminary to Round 2 game and the Round 2 games. An open draw made on Galway Bay FM on 14 May 2014 split the teams into two groups. The top two teams will progress to the Shield Competition. The 4 second and third placed teams will contest relegation.

Qualifier Group A

Qualifier Group B

Relegation
The second and third placed teams from the Qualifier Group Phase cross played. The two losing teams will played each other with the loser being relegated to Intermediate for 2015.

Semi-finals

Final

 Kinvara are relegated.

Shield Competition
10 teams: the 8 third and fourth placed teams from the Group Phase and the top two teams from the Qualifier Group Phase. Two teams were drawn to play two others - the two winning teams plus the 6 other teams will play open drawn quarter-finals, semi-finals and a final.

Shield Preliminary Round and Quarter-finals
Carnmore, Clarinbridge, Sarsfields, Mullagh, Tynagh-Abbey/Duniry and Turloughmore were all eliminated before the semi-finals.

Shield Semi-Finals

Final

Scoring

Top Scorers

Individual feats
Cian Burke scored 5-2 from play for Athenry against Carnmore in their Group D clash on 20 July 2014

References

Galway Senior Hurling Championship
Galway Senior Hurling Championship